The Petit Beurre, or Véritable Petit Beurre, also known under the initials VPB, is a kind of shortbread from Nantes, that is best known in France in general and especially in Pays de la Loire. It is the Petit Beurre of the LU company, which has become a success worldwide. The dry biscuit was invented in 1886 by Louis Lefèvre-Utile in the city of Nantes and was inspired by some English products of the time. But the Petit Beurre of LU was not the first to appear, also LU does not have the exclusivity of the name.

The substantive Petit Beurre is a generic term from the past; it has a hyphen and when it is plural Petit-beurre is often misspelled. It is known in Anglo-Saxon countries as the French Petit Beurre and is called "Petibör" in Turkey and "Πτι-Μπερ"/ "PteeBer" in Greece.

Le Petit Beurre LU 
Le Petit Beurre LU was invented by Louis Lefèvre-Utile, son of Pauline Lefèvre-Utile, in 1886. A cookie cutter in the form of Petit Beurre was made on September 8, 1886. But Louis Lefèvre did not file the trademark "Petit Beurre LU"  until April 9, 1888 to the Nantes Commercial Courts.

Characteristics 
They measure 65 mm long, 54 mm wide, and 6.5 mm thick for a unit weight of 8.33 g. The surface of the biscuit is smooth and has twenty-four indents (four lines with six columns) intermixed with the inscription "LU PETIT-BEURRE NANTES" in three lines. The characters of the writing are intended to be a reminder of the writing books that the grandmother of one of the creators of Le Petit Beurre would read. The biscuit is watered with milk before baking to get a "homemade" look. The thickness of 8 biscuits is equal to the width, which allows a square packaging.

Fabrication 
At its plant in La Haie-Fouassière, about twenty kilometers south of Nantes, LU produces over 9,000 tons of VPB a year, about 1 billion biscuits packaged in 41 million packs of VPB.

Decoration 
Le Petit Beurre LU is decorated with four corners in the shape of ears, fourteen teeth in length, ten teeth in width or fifty-two teeth in total, and presents twenty-four indents in four lines of six. These numbers could be interpreted: the four seasons, the fifty-two weeks of the year, or the twenty-four hours in a day.

Publicity 
One of the most famous slogans of Petit Beurre is: "Four ears and forty-eight teeth."

Ingredients and nutrition 
According to the maker, le Petit Beurre LU contains: 
 Wheat flour : 73.5%
 Powdered sugar
 Butter : 13.6% 
 Evaporated milk : 1.3% 
 Salt
 Baking powder 
 Extract or Flavoring 
Also according to the same source, the nutritional intake are the following:

Other Petits Beurre 
When designing the Petit Beurre, Louis Lefèvre-Utile was quickly copied by his competitors. He then set up a rather virulent advertising campaign in which he renamed his biscuit the "Véritable Petit Beurre" or "True Petit Beurre". After many years, he managed to impose the basic recipe, without chemical additives, reducing the number of competitors.

Another sweet butter biscuit produced in France is known as the "Petit beurre with Lorient sea salt.”

In 1891, at Hanover in Germany, the Bahlsen company began making a Butterkeks (butter biscuit very similar to the French Petit Beurre) called Leibniz-Keks in homage to the philosopher and mathematician Gottfried Wilhelm von Leibniz. Today many other companies throughout the world make similar biscuits.

See also
 List of cookies

References
 ↑ a et b Patrick Thibault, La Belle Histoire de LU, p. 73.
 ↑ "  " archive
 ↑ Patrick Lefèvre-Utile, L'Art du biscuit, Éditions Hazan, 
 ↑« Interview de Gérard Philippe, directeur de l'usine LU »archive L'internaute (consulté le 6 juin 2008).
 ↑ Composition indiquée sur un paquet de biscuits
 ↑ Informations nutritionnelles mentionnées sur un paquet de biscuits
 ↑ Patrick Thibault, La Belle Histoire de LU, p. 77.
 ↑ « Petit Beurre de Lorient » archive Albert Menès (consulté le6 janvier 2008)

External links 
 History and manufacture of Nantes Petit Beurre, images and captions, at Linternaute.com

Further reading

 
  
 

Cookies
Nantes
Breton cuisine